The 2015 SMP F4 Championship season in motorsport, was the inaugural season of the SMP F4 Championship, a racing series regulated according to FIA Formula 4 regulations. It was a motor racing series for the North European Zone (NEZ) held in Estonia, Finland and Russia. The 2015 season began on 16 May at Ahvenisto in Finland and finished on 3 October at the auto24ring in Estonia, after seven triple header rounds.

The series' inaugural champion was Finnish driver Niko Kari in his first season of car racing. Kari took seven overall wins (including a weekend sweep at Moscow Raceway) during the 2015 season, but also added five class victories behind British driver Enaam Ahmed – who was ineligible to score championship points – for a total of twelve during the season. Kari finished over 150 points clear of his next closest rival, Vladimir Atoev; Atoev won three races, all coming on the same weekend at Alastaro. Third place in the championship was settled in the final race in Estonia; Nerses Isaakyan took five runner-up positions in six races which allowed him to overhaul Aleksanteri Huovinen in the championship standings. Huovinen was another three-time race winner; winning twice at Ahvenisto and once at Moscow Raceway. Two other drivers won races in 2015 as Aleksey Korneev won races at Moscow Raceway and Sochi, while Nikita Troitskiy won the third race at Ahvenisto; the drivers finished fifth and sixth in the drivers' championship.

Drivers

Race calendar and results
The round at Moscow Raceway, held over 5–7 June, was a support event to the FIA WTCC Race of Russia. The original scheduled final meeting was scheduled to be held over 18–20 September at Sochi Autodrom, but was first postponed to 2–3 October and later moved to the Auto24ring.

Championship standings

References

External links

SMP F4 Championship seasons
SMP F4 Championship
SMP F4 Championship
SMP F4
SMP F4